Zenit Đozić (born 8 October 1961) is a Bosnian actor, humorist, television producer and former rock drummer.

Career
Known under nicknames Zena and Fu-Do, Đozić started his entertainment career as a drummer of Sarajevo-based garage rock band Zabranjeno Pušenje.

He left Zabranjeno Pušenje before the band recorded its first album, but formed Top lista nadrealista with his former bandmates and became one of the most prominent members of the group. He then returned to the group on their second album in back vocal capacity, and did the subsequent tour with them.

He stayed in Sarajevo during the Bosnian War and took part in war-time sketches of Top lista nadrealista.

After the war, he finished the Academy of Performing Arts (ASU) in Sarajevo and then received a master's degree in television production in London. Since 2006, he has been living in Sarajevo and is working as a television producer.

Discography
With Zabranjeno pušenje
 Dok čekaš sabah sa šejtanom (1985)

See also
No Smoking in Sarajevo

References

External links
 
Zenit Đozić at Discogs

1961 births
Living people
People from Bugojno
Male actors from Sarajevo
Musicians from Sarajevo
Bosnia and Herzegovina rock musicians
Bosnia and Herzegovina male film actors
Television producers
Zabranjeno pušenje members
Bosnia and Herzegovina comedians
New Primitivism people
Top lista nadrealista